822 Lalage (prov. designation:  or ) is a background asteroid from the inner regions of the asteroid belt. It was discovered on 31 March 1916, by astronomer Max Wolf at the Heidelberg-Königstuhl State Observatory in southwest Germany. Any reference to the origin of the asteroid's name is unknown.

Orbit and classification 

Lalage is a non-family asteroid of the main belt's background population when applying the hierarchical clustering method to its proper orbital elements. It orbits the Sun in the inner main-belt at a distance of 1.9–2.6 AU once every 3 years and 5 months (1,237 days; semi-major axis of 2.26 AU). Its orbit has an eccentricity of 0.16 and an inclination of 1° with respect to the ecliptic. The body's observation arc begins at the Bergedorf Observatory on 6 April 1916, one week after its official discovery observation at Heidelberg.

Naming 

Any reference of this minor planet name to a person or occurrence is unknown.

Unknown meaning 

Among the many thousands of named minor planets, Lalage is one of 120 asteroids for which  has been published. All of these asteroids have low numbers, the first one being . They were discovered between 1876 and the 1930s, predominantly by astronomers Auguste Charlois, Johann Palisa, Max Wolf and Karl Reinmuth.

Physical characteristics 

In the Tholen classification, Lalage has an unusual spectrum, that is closest to a dark D-type, somewhat similar to an X-type, and, to a lesser extent, a carbonaceous C-type asteroid. Conversely, the Small Solar System Objects Spectroscopic Survey (S3OS2), classifies the body an uncommon A-type in the survey's Tholen-like taxonomic variant, and as an Sl-subtype – which transitions from the stony S-type to the uncommon L-type asteroid – in its SMASS-like variant.

Rotation period 

In September 1992, a rotational lightcurve of Lalage was obtained from photometric observations by Polish astronomer Wiesław Wiśniewski. Lightcurve analysis gave a short rotation period of  hours with a high brightness variation of  magnitude, indicative of a non-spherical, elongated shape. Since then, additional period determinations gave  hours with an amplitude of  magnitude by David Higgins in October 2009,  hours with an amplitude of  magnitude by Robert Stephens in January 2014, and  hours with an amplitude of  magnitude by Daniel A. Klinglesmith in February 2014. The modelling also gave two poles at (343.0°, −74.0°) and (133.0°, −75.0°) in ecliptic coordinates (λ, β).

Diameter and albedo 

The Collaborative Asteroid Lightcurve Link assumes an albedo of 0.20 and a diameter of 10.16 kilometers based on an absolute magnitude of 12.33.

References

External links 
 Lightcurve Database Query (LCDB), at www.minorplanet.info
 Dictionary of Minor Planet Names, Google books
 Discovery Circumstances: Numbered Minor Planets (1)-(5000) – Minor Planet Center
 
 

000822
Discoveries by Max Wolf
Named minor planets
000822
19160331